Hong Kong Island Magazine is a free-distributed English language lifestyle magazine. It is a Hong Kong-based English-language monthly published by Fast Media Ltd. The magazine targets highly-affluent professionals, aged 28-58 years old, who work in Hong Kong and live in Central, Soho and the Mid-Levels.  It offers living advice, parenting and education advice, property news as well as exploring outdoor activities and local entertainment listings.  New issues are distributed on the first day of each month. The magazine is mailed free to subscribers whose homes are valued HK$15 million or more. It is also distributed in select residential towers, private members clubs, spas, coffee shops and English language schools. It has a claimed readership of 60,000.

References

External links
 Official website

2012 establishments in Hong Kong
English-language magazines
Free magazines
Magazines published in Hong Kong
Lifestyle magazines
Magazines established in 2012
Monthly magazines